The 1995 LSU Tigers football team represented Louisiana State University in the sport of American football for the 1995 NCAA Division I-A football season. Coached by Gerry DiNardo in his first season at LSU, the Tigers played their home games at Tiger Stadium in Baton Rouge, Louisiana. The team won seven games, lost four, and had one tie. It concluded the season with a 45–26 win over Michigan State in the 1995 Independence Bowl.

The 45 points scored by LSU in their bowl win over the Spartans was the second-most points (behind Drew Brees and Purdue's 52 points in 1999) allowed by a Nick Saban coached team until the 2019 LSU Tigers put up 46 against Saban's Alabama squad (which was also the most points surrendered by any Alabama team at home in regulation).

Schedule

Roster

References

LSU
LSU Tigers football seasons
Independence Bowl champion seasons
LSU Tigers football